Nada Šargin (: born 19 January 1977) is a Serbian actress. She appeared in more than twenty films since 2003.

Selected filmography

References

External links 

1977 births
Living people
People from Zrenjanin
Serbian film actresses
Zoran Radmilović Award winners